Those People of the Nile  (Egyptian Arabic: الناس والنيل, French: Ces gens du Nil, translit: Al Nass Wal Nil or Al Nas wal Nil, aliases: People of the Nile) is a 1972 drama film directed by Youssef Chahine. It stars Salah Zulfikar and Soad Hosny. The film is co-produced by companies in Egypt and Russia .

Plot
Set during the diversion of the Nile current in 1964 during the building of the High Dam. The foreground of the film shows Yehia as a worker in the high dam project. Later, we will understand that Yehia is not a real worker but a committed writer, tired by years of activism. Because of this past and this fatigue, the young girl from a good family with whom he falls in love, and who loves him, finally leaves him. Because she doesn't want a worn-out man. But Yehia is focused on covering the secrets of the huge project. And the rest of personalities begin to remember the past, through the story of Amin, the doctor who joins the dam to serve its staff, his wife Nadia who refuses to move to Aswan with him, and the Russian engineer, Alex, whose wife cannot tolerate life in Egypt.

Cast
 Salah Zulfikar as Yehia
 Soad Hosny as Nadia
 Ezzat El Alaili as Amin
 Mahmoud El-Meliguy
 Igor Vladimirov
 Vladimir Ivashov
 Madiha Salem
 Valentina Kutsenko
 Inna Fyodorova
 Sveltana Zhgun
 Tawfik El-Deken
 Saif Abdel Rahman
 Fatma Emara
 Valentina

Production 
The film was joint Egyptian-Soviet production as a sign of friendship between the two states at the time.

Youssef Chahine has diverted diplomatic material into poetic and lyrical material. And throughout the film, this important question: where does this energy come from? "We will change the course of history as we have changed the course of the world's greatest river." That kind of feeling always makes a movie. And it is visible that Chahine believed in his country's capabilities to build this huge project, the High Dam..

See also 
 Son of the Nile
 The Nile and the Life
 Soad Hosny filmography
 Salah Zulfikar filmography
 Youssef Chahine filmography
 List of Egyptian films of 1972

References

External links 
 
One day, the Nile on elCinema

1972 films
1970s Arabic-language films
20th-century Egyptian films
Films shot in Egypt
Egyptian drama films
Films directed by Youssef Chahine